Cryogenic Studio, Vol. 2 is a compilation album, released in 2000, and the follow-up to the 1998 album Cryogenic Studios. It is composed from songs of electronic music bands Front Line Assembly, Noise Unit, Delerium, Pro>Tech, Equinox, and Synæsthesia, all of which are projects of Canadian electronic musician Bill Leeb. The album title refers to the name of Cryogenic Studio in Vancouver that serves as headquarters studio for Front Line Assembly and related side projects. All tracks except "Biosphere", "Eros", "Door to the Otherside", "Miracle", "Inner Chaos", and "Re-Thread" were re-released in 2005 by Cleopatra on the compilation album The Best of Cryogenic Studio, together with most of the tracks from previous compilation album Cryogenic Studios.

The back cover shows several errors. The sixth song on disc one is called "Door to the Otherside" but only "Otherside" is visible. The ninth track on disc two is falsely labeled "Turmoil" and the track's length is not correct. Also, the number of the bands does not match the number of the songs.

Track listing

"Amnesia", "Amorphous", and "Ambience" are previously unreleased.

Personnel

Front Line Assembly
 Bill Leeb
 Chris Peterson
 Rhys Fulber
 Michael Balch

Technical personnel
 Carylann Loeppky – cover art

References

Front Line Assembly compilation albums
2000 compilation albums
Cleopatra Records compilation albums
Industrial compilation albums